The 1965 New South Wales Rugby Football League premiership was the 58th season of the rugby league competition based in Sydney. Ten clubs from across the city competed for the J.J. Giltinan Shield and the WD & HO Wills Cup during the season, which culminated in a grand final between St. George and South Sydney.

The 1965 season also saw the retirement from the League of future Australian Rugby League Hall of Fame inductee, Norm Provan.

Teams

Ladder

Finals

Grand Final

In 1965, the Sydney Cricket Ground could accommodate 70,000. With capacity already reached two hours before kick-off the SCG staff closed the gates and posted an attendance figure of just over 78,000, a ground record that still stands as of 2016 and with changes to the venue in the years since resulting in a decreased capacity of 48,000 is unlikely to be broken. Meanwhile, the surrounding streets and parklands were packed with an estimated 40,000 people who were still trying to get into a ground. Hundreds chose to break in by storming the Members gates and proceeded to climb the grandstands, perching themselves on the roofs. Scores more bought tickets to the Motor Show which was being held next door in the Royal Showground. From here they took up vantage points on the Showground Pavilions with good views of the SCG pitch. After consultation the police allowed thousands to sit on the ground itself, covering the outer ring of the oval.

At 3pm, St George captain-coach Norm Provan, the last player from the Dragons' 1956 premiership-winning side, led his team onto the field in what would be his final match before retiring. Souths had already beaten Saints twice in 1965 and the huge crowd that attended were either looking to see the milestone 10th successive win or to see the dominant run halted. The St George team, with an average age of 27, faced a real threat from their younger South Sydney rivals whose average age was 22.

Rabbitohs fullback, Kevin Longbottom opened the scoring with a 55-yard penalty goal in the 20th minute – the kick receiving applause from St. George fullback Graeme Langlands. St George replied with a Billy Smith try. Langlands and Longbottom exchanged penalty goals with both players booting the ball more than 50 yards. It was a tough encounter with fiery forward charges from Provan, Johnny Raper and Kevin Ryan. The scrums in particular were no place for the faint-hearted, and Ryan was being unsettled by the Souths' front row of Jim Morgan and John O'Neill. In one scrum, after seeing Rabbitohs hooker Fred Anderson reaching into the tunnel, Ryan stood on Anderson, raked him back and proceeded to walk over him. The Dragons pack surged forward, forcing Anderson along the ground through the St George second row and out the back of the scrum. The 'keelhauled' Anderson sat dazed and bleeding on the ground with the ball still in hand.

The second half began with more penalty goals to Langlands and Longbottom. Souths' lock Ron Coote kept his side in the match with two brilliant try-saving tackles. With 13 minutes to go, Johnny King scored, continuing his amazing record of scoring tries in six successive Grand Finals. Souths' Eric Simms kicked a penalty goal, giving them some hope but Saints held their line and at full-time the score was 12–8. St George had won their tenth consecutive Grand Final and Provan bowed out victorious. At the sounding of the full-time siren, the SCG was invaded by thousands of fans and the ground became a sea of people – any chance of a victory lap was soon forgotten. Kevin Ryan was named Man of the Match.

Some records were set in the 1965 Grand Final. The attendance of 78,056 is the record for a rugby league match at the SCG and for thirty four years, until the Sydney Olympic Stadium was opened in 1999, this stood as the highest attendance at a rugby league match in Australia. Norm Provan's ten premiership wins achieved that day stands as the most number of grand final successes by a player. He also holds equal first place with his St George team-mate Brian Clay for the highest number of grand final appearances. Clay's ten appearances include two losses in 1954 and 1955 with Newtown.

St. George 12 (Tries: Smith, King. Goals: Langlands 3.)

South Sydney 8 ( Goals: Longbottom 3, Simms.). Crowd 78,056

Player statistics
The following statistics are as of the conclusion of Round 18.

Top 5 point scorers

Top 5 try scorers

Top 5 goal scorers

References

External links
 Rugby League Tables – Season 1965 The World of Rugby League
 Writer, Larry (1995) Never Before, Never Again, Pan MacMillan, Sydney
Results:1961-70 at rabbitohs.com.au
1965 J J Giltinan Shield and WD & HO Wills Cup at rleague.com
NSWRFL season 1965 at rugbyleagueproject.com
1965 Final at Dragons History site

New South Wales Rugby League premiership
Nswrfl season